Vincenzo Agnello Suardi (1582 – September 1644) was a Roman Catholic prelate who served as Bishop of Mantua (1620–1644) and Bishop of Alba (1616–1620).

Biography
Vincenzo Agnello Suardi was born in Mantua, Italy in 1582.
On 5 December 1616, he was appointed during the papacy of Pope Paul V as Bishop of Alba.
On 21 December 1616, he was consecrated bishop by Giovanni Garzia Mellini, Cardinal-Priest of Santi Quattro Coronati, with Ulpiano Volpi, Archbishop Emeritus of Chieti, and Francesco Sacrati (cardinal), Titular Archbishop of Damascus. serving as co-consecrators. 
On 13 May 1619, he was appointed during the papacy of Pope Paul V as Bishop of Mantua; and succeeded on 2 March 1620.
He served as Bishop of Mantua until his death in September 1644. 
While bishop, he was the principal co-consecrator of Ludovico Gonzaga (bishop), Bishop of Alba (1619); and Scipione Agnelli, Bishop of Casale Monferrato (1624).

References

External links and additional sources
 (for Chronology of Bishops) 
 (for Chronology of Bishops) 
 (for Chronology of Bishops) 
 (for Chronology of Bishops) 

17th-century Italian Roman Catholic bishops
Bishops of Mantua
Bishops appointed by Pope Paul V
1582 births
1644 deaths